The End is a 2007 Hungarian comedy film directed by Gábor Rohonyi.

Cast 
 Emil Keres - Emil
 Teri Földi - Hédi
 Judit Schell - Ági
 Zoltán Schmied - Andor
 Đoko Rosić - Juan

References

External links 

2007 comedy films
2007 films
Hungarian comedy films
2000s Hungarian-language films